Ughurlu Muhammad Beg or Ughurlu Mehmed (d. 1477) was a prince of the Aq Qoyunlu, son of Uzun Hassan and Jan Khatun. As the eldest son to Uzun Hasan, he governed the city of Shiraz and desired to be the ruler of the Aq Qoyunlu after the death of his father. Nevertheless, his stepmother Seljuk Shah Khatun, another wife of Uzun Hasan, prevented this. She always slandered Ughurlu Muhammad to Uzun Hasan ti favor her own son, Khalil. Afterwards, he rebelled against his father and took refuge to the Ottoman Empire. Mehmed the Conqueror welcomed him and got him married to his daughter Gevherhan Hatun. Ahmad Beg was born from this marriage. Mehmed II gave him Sivas to rule, but was killed near Erzincan in the year 1477.

Battle of Otlukbeli 

Ughurlu Muhammad commanded the left wing of the Aq Qoyunlu army. He prevented Şehzade Bayezid's attacks, where he fiercely defended a stream between the Ottomans and his troops and prevented Şehzade Bayezid from crossing their side. Later, when he heard that his father had escaped and his brother was killed, he also withdrew from the battlefield.

References 

1477 deaths
Year of birth unknown

People from the Aq Qoyunlu
Damats
Ottoman governors of Sivas
Defectors